Hansel and Gretel is a 2002 American fantasy comedy film based on the fairy tale of the same name by Brothers Grimm. The film is directed by Gary J. Tunnicliffe and produced by Steve Austin and Jonathan Bogner. Jacob Smith and Taylor Momsen portray the eponymous characters, alongside Howie Mandel, Alana Austin, Delta Burke, Lynn Redgrave, Bobcat Goldthwait, and Sinbad. The film follows siblings Hansel and Gretel as they try to escape from the Magic Forest and a witch's gingerbread house with the help of the Sandman and the Wood Fairy.

Plot 
In a modern home, two children named Andrew and Katie, about to go to bed during a thunderstorm. They ask their father to read them a story to help them sleep. The father finds the fairy tale of Hansel and Gretel and begins to read it. 

Hansel and Gretel are living with their father and their wicked stepmother in a very tiny shack near a forest. Since they are very poor, the father decides to sell Hansel and Gretel's late biological mother's necklace, but the Stepmother steals it intending on selling it herself so she can become wealthy. The next day, the stepmother abandons the children in the Magic Forest.  

Afterward, Hansel and Gretel go looking for food and get tricked into going to a troll's cave. They are then saved by the Sandman, whom they befriend. They also let Wood Fairy free, whom they also befriend. Throughout the story the Sandman and the fairy are always bickering, which causes problems at times. 

One night when the Sandman and Wood Fairy went out to get some food for the kids, Hansel and Gretel wander off and find a gingerbread house after a windstorm. The elderly woman that lives there invites them in, feeds them, and puts them to bed. When they wake up the next morning, a raven comes to the window to tell them that the woman is actually a witch who eats children. The Witch walks into the room, locks Hansel in a box, and makes Gretel cook and Hansel eat regularly to fatten him up. Later on, Gretel breaks a mirror and the Witch becomes a green-skinned crone. The Sandman and Wood Fairy break into the gingerbread house and put the Witch in the oven, killing her. The father finds them and they do not worry about the Stepmother, who had gone to the Troll's house, where the Troll then abandoned her after she made him cook and clean for her. 

The scene returns to the bedroom of the two kids and their father who says goodnight and leaves the room. The Sandman, the Boogeyman, and the Troll  drop by, say hello to the children, and take the Hansel and Gretel book. They explain to the children that they are real, which is how the Brothers Grimm were inspired to write the story. The Sandman sprinkles the children with his sleep dust and it is shown that the Stepmother found the gingerbread house and moved in.

Cast

Reception 
The film has a 0% "Rotten" score on Rotten Tomatoes. IMDb gave it a 4.2 out of a possible 10. It performed poorly at the box office.

References

External links
 
 
 

2002 films
2000s adventure comedy films
2000s fantasy comedy films
2002 independent films
American adventure comedy films
American fantasy comedy films
American independent films
Films based on Hansel and Gretel
Films about poverty
Films about fairies and sprites
Films about trolls
Films about witchcraft
Films about kidnapping
Films directed by Gary J. Tunnicliffe
2002 comedy films
2000s English-language films
2000s American films
Films about birds
Films about children
Films about widowhood